Lamiessa eumolpoides is a species of beetle in the family Cerambycidae, and the only species in the genus Lamiessa. It was described by Bates in 1885.

References

Desmiphorini
Beetles described in 1885
Monotypic beetle genera